Luboš Fišer (30 September 1935 – 22 June 1999) was a Czech composer, born in Prague. He was known both for his soundtracks and chamber music. From 1952 to 1956 he studied composition at the Prague Conservatory as a pupil of Emil Hlobil. From 1956 he studied at the AMU in Prague. His first publicly performed compositions were Four Pieces for Violin and Piano (1954).

Selected compositions
Orchestra
 Patnáct listů podle Dürerovy Apokalypsy (Fifteen Prints after Dürer's Apocalypse) (1965)
 Double (1969)
 Lament for chamber orchestra (1971)
 Report for wind ensemble (1971)
 Labyrinth (1977)
 Serenády pro Salzburg (Serenades for Salzburg) for chamber orchestra (1979)
 Meridián (1980)
 Sonata for orchestra (1998)

Concertante
 Concerto da camera for piano and orchestra (two versions, 1964 with full orchestra, 1970 with wind)
 Concerto for piano and orchestra (1979)
 Romance for violin and orchestra (1980)
 Concerto for two pianos and orchestra (1983)
 Concerto for violin and orchestra (1998)
 Sonata per Leonardo for guitar and orchestra
 Pastorale per Giuseppe Tartini for guitar and orchestra 
Chamber
 Dialogue for trumpet and organ (1996)
 Impromptu for clarinet and piano (1986)
 Piano Trio (1978)
 Romance for violin and piano (1980)
 Ruce (Hands), Sonata for violin and piano (1961)
 Sonata for cello and piano (1975)
 Sonata for solo viola and string quartet (1991)
 Sonata for two cellos and piano (1979)
 Sonata "In Memoriam Terezin" for violin solo (1981)
 String Quartet (1983–1984)
 Sonata for cello solo (1986)
 Testis for string quartet (1980)
 Variace na neznámé téma (Variations on an Unknown Theme), for string quartet (1976)

Piano
 Sny a valčíky (Dreams and Waltzes) (1993)
 Sonata No.1 (1955)
 Sonata No.3 (1960)
 Sonata No.4 (1962–1964)
 Sonata No.5 (1974)
 Sonata No.6 "Fras" (1978)
 Sonata No.7 (1987)
 Sonata No.8 (1996)

 Organ
 Reliéf (The Relief) for organ solo (1964)

Choral
 Requiem (1968)
 Vánoční koledy (Christmas Carols) for soloists, mixed choir, and orchestra (1969)

Vocal
 Istanu, Melodrama for reciter, alto flute, and four percussionists (1980)
 Zapomenuté písně (Forgotten Songs) on Texts of Gypsy Poetry for mezzo-soprano, alto flute, viola, and piano (1985)

Soundtrack
 On the Comet (1970)
 Valerie and Her Week of Wonders (Finders Keepers Records 2006)
Morgiana (Finders Keepers Records 2013)

Notes

References
Czech Music page on Fišer's works
The Apocalyptic Visions of Luboš Fišer

Czech classical composers
Czech male classical composers
20th-century classical composers
1935 births
1999 deaths
Czech film score composers
Male film score composers
Musicians from Prague
Prague Conservatory alumni
International Rostrum of Composers prize-winners
20th-century Czech male musicians